The Final Programme is a 1973 British fantasy science fiction-thriller film directed by Robert Fuest, and starring Jon Finch and Jenny Runacre. It was based on the 1968 Jerry Cornelius novel of the same name by Michael Moorcock. It was distributed in the United States and elsewhere as The Last Days of Man on Earth. It is the only Moorcock novel to have reached the screen.

Plot synopsis
The story opens in Lapland at the funeral pyre of Jerry Cornelius's father, a Nobel Prize-winning scientist who has developed the "Final Programme"—a design for a perfect, self-replicating human being. Jerry Cornelius, playboy physicist and dashing secret agent, is in attendance. Afterwards he is questioned by Dr. Smiles, who wants to retrieve a microfilm which he knows is in the Cornelius family home in England. Cornelius, a conspicuous counter-culture dandy with addictions to chocolate biscuits and alcohol, threatens to blow up the family house. Flashbacks to Jerry's conversations with Professor Hira about the Kali Yuga inform the narrative, providing a philosophical background of the world in its final days. In various scenes we learn that the Vatican no longer exists and that Amsterdam has been razed to ash, and we see Trafalgar Square in a post-apocalyptic scenario of wrecked cars piled atop one another.

Back in the UK, a group of scientists led by Dr. Smiles and the formidable Miss Brunner (who consumes her lovers) try to persuade Cornelius to locate the microfilm containing his father's Final Programme. Jerry learns from his family servant that his sister Catherine has been imprisoned by his evil, drug-addicted brother, Frank; Frank has Catherine held captive in their family home, and has addicted her to drugs for unspecified reasons. Jerry, whose relationship with Catherine is implied to be incestuous, instructs his servant John to smuggle Catherine to the lodge on the property's grounds; he will "take care of Frank". He consults Major Wrongway Lindbergh, who supplies him with a high-powered jet aircraft, and his old friend "Shades" who can supply him with napalm.

The attack on the old house commences. The house is protected by a sound system that induces pseudo-epilepsy, but Jerry and the others get inside unharmed. They fight their way past many traps, including poison gas and a lethal chessboard. Jerry finds John fatally wounded by Frank. John confesses before dying that Catherine has not been freed and that Frank has returned her to the bedroom. Jerry finds and confronts Frank, and a needlegun fight ensues. In the confusion, Catherine is accidentally killed by Jerry. Jerry is wounded, and Frank falls into the hands of Miss Brunner. She forces him to open the vaults, but he outsmarts her and escapes with the microfilm.

After Jerry recuperates from the poison of Frank's needles, he meets with Miss Brunner. She introduces him to her new lover, Jenny. They plot to recapture Frank. Jenny is induced to play piano naked in Jerry's flat, where she is consumed by Miss Brunner. Frank has set up a meeting to sell the microfilm to Dr. Baxter (Patrick Magee); Jerry and Miss Brunner track them down. Miss Brunner consumes Baxter. Another fight with Frank ensues, and Frank is killed. Miss Brunner and Jerry return to Lapland by hot-air balloon with the recovered microfilm.

The scientists put the Final Programme into operation: the process requires that Miss Brunner be combined with another person to form a hermaphroditic being. Brunner chooses Jerry over the scientists' intended subject, Dmitri, and she traps Dmitri in a lethal steambath. Dmitri escapes Brunner's trap and fights Jerry, who is severely wounded. Brunner intervenes at the last moment, shooting Dmitri but not killing him. The scientists, working against time, scramble to re-calibrate their experiment for Jerry, who is placed inside a large chamber with Brunner. As the process reaches its climax, the two subjects are bathed by solar radiation and blur into each other. The barely controlled process heats the equipment outside to destruction and the scientists are left either dead or insensible. A single being emerges from the chamber. Dmitri confronts the creature. Unseen at first, the being speaks with Jerry's voice. The creature does not know if it is a Messiah, but is sure that its creation means the end of an age. When seen from the onlookers' perspective, the being is Jerry Cornelius, his body now altered to appear as a hunched, pre-modern hominid. The creature leaves Brunner's hidden base, and observes that it is "a very tasty world".

Production
Michael Moorcock has said that he originally envisioned space-rock band Hawkwind as providing the music for the entire film, and as also appearing in the scene with the nuns playing slot machines where Jerry is trying to buy napalm. Hawkwind, and Moorcock himself, can in fact be glimpsed briefly in this scene right at the back of the set. Director Robert Fuest, however, did not like the band, and instead had music with a jazzy feel placed into the film. Moorcock has also praised the acting performances in the film, and commented that it was only when he told the actors it was supposed to be funny that they delivered lines with more of his intended black humour. 

According to Moorcock, the film was released as the top half of a double bill with Intimate Confessions of a Chinese Courtesan. Later in the run The Final Programme was moved to the bottom half of the bill.

Reception
Baird Searles found the film "an almost unmitigated disaster", with "an ending so inane that you will want your money back even if you wait and see it on television".

On its DVD release in the UK in 2013, The Guardian wrote: "Director Robert Fuest was responsible for the pop-surrealism of The Avengers and the twisted art deco of Vincent Price's Dr Phibes movies, and here he makes sure every frame looks stunning, throwing so much in to please and confuse the eye, often at the cost of narrative coherence. But who cares when the movie is full of cryptic, sly humour and endlessly inventive imagery, such as an amusement arcade where nuns play fruit machines as the world ends."

Cast
 Jon Finch as Jerry Cornelius 
 Jenny Runacre as Miss Brunner 
 Hugh Griffith as Professor Hira 
 Patrick Magee as Dr. Baxter 
 Sterling Hayden as Major Wrongway Lindbergh
 Ronald Lacey as Shades
 Harry Andrews as John 
 Graham Crowden as Dr. Smiles 
 George Coulouris as Dr. Powys 
 Basil Henson as Dr. Lucas
 Derrick O'Connor as Frank
 Sarah Douglas as Catherine
 Sandy Ratcliff as Jenny
 Julie Ege as Miss Dazzle
 Gilles Millinaire as Dmitri
 Sandra Dickinson as Waitress

Home video releases
The Final Programme was released on DVD and VHS formats in the US in 2001 by Anchor Bay Entertainment. The DVD featured a remastered print of the film, which could be played with an audio commentary featuring director Fuest and star Runacre. Other special features included the American theatrical trailer and TV spot, and an insert replica of the British poster.

On 7 October 2013, the Network imprint released the film on DVD in the UK. This release is presented in a new transfer from the original film elements, featuring both the 1.77:1 theatrical ratio and the full frame, as-filmed version of the main feature. Special features include original theatrical trailers, an Italian title sequence, image gallery, and promotional material in PDF format.

On 7 January 2020, Shout! Factory released the film on Blu-ray in the U.S. The aspect ratio of this release is 1.85:1. Special features include an audio commentary with director Robert Fuest and actress Jenny Runacre moderated by author/film historian Jonathan Sothcott, the U.S. theatrical trailer, and a U.S. TV spot, all carried over from the old Anchor Bay DVD.

References

Bibliography
Hardy, Phil (1995), The Overlook Film Encyclopedia: Science Fiction, The Overlook Press, p. 310-311, 
Hochscherf, Tobias & Leggott, James (2011), British Science Fiction Film and Television: Critical Essays, McFarland & Company, Inc., p. 60-72, 
Hunter, I.Q. (1999), British Science Fiction Cinema (British Popular Cinema), Routledge, p. 210, 
Willis, Donald C. (1985), Variety's Complete Science Fiction Reviews, Garland Publishing, Inc., p. 304,

External links
 
 

1973 films
1970s fantasy films
1970s science fiction thriller films
Dystopian films
Films directed by Robert Fuest
Michael Moorcock's Multiverse
British science fiction films
Films about intersex
Films based on British novels
Films based on science fiction novels
Films shot in Almería
EMI Films films
New World Pictures films
Films produced by David Puttnam
1970s English-language films
1970s British films